Jamien Sherwood (born January 12, 2000) is an American football linebacker for the New York Jets of the National Football League (NFL). He played college football at Auburn.

Early years
Sherwood attended Jensen Beach High School in Jensen Beach, Florida. He committed to Auburn University to play college football.

College career
Sherwood played in 13 games his true freshman season at Auburn in 2018 and recorded 23 tackles, one interception and 1.5 sacks. As a sophomore in 2019, he had 43 tackles in 13 games. As a junior in 2020, Sherwood became a starter for the first time. He finished the 2020 season with 75 tackles and one sack.

Professional career

Sherwood was selected in the fifth round (146th overall) of the 2021 NFL Draft by the New York Jets. Sherwood started in his NFL debut in Week 1 against the Carolina Panthers. In Week 7, Sherwood suffered a torn Achilles and was placed on season-ending injured reserve on October 26, 2021. As a rookie, he started in four of the five games he played in. He finished with 15 total tackles.

Sherwood returned from his injury for the 2022 season. He appeared in all 17 games. He recorded 16 total tackles and mainly played special teams.

References

External links
New York Jets bio
Auburn Tigers bio

Living people
People from Jensen Beach, Florida
Players of American football from Florida
American football safeties
Auburn Tigers football players
African-American players of American football
New York Jets players
2000 births
21st-century African-American sportspeople
20th-century African-American sportspeople